Rochelle Alers (born August 7, 1943) is an American writer of romance novels. She has also written under the pen names Susan James and Rena McLeary.

Biography
Rochelle Alers was born on August 7, 1943 in Manhattan, New York, where she was also raised. After earning degrees in sociology and psychology, she taught pre-school for a time before entering the business world.

Alers began writing her first novel in 1984, after a decade of reading romance novels.  She finished her first manuscript, the novel Hideway, in 1985.  After several rejections because her work did not fit the formula of a category romance novel, Alers perfected her style and was first published by Doubleday Books in 1988.

Almost two million copies of her novels are now in print, and they have regularly appeared on the Waldenbooks, Borders, and Essence bestseller lists. She has been awarded the Gold Pen Award, the Emma Award, the Vivian Stephens Award for Excellence in Romance Writing, the Romantic Times Career Achievement Award, and the Zora Neale Hurston Literary Award. She writes full-time currently after retiring from her job as a Community Liaison Specialist for a state funded abuse program in Long Island.

Bibliography

As Rochelle Alers

Single novels
Careless Whispers, (1988)
My Love's Keeper, (1991)
Happily Ever After, (1994)
Home Sweet Home, (1996)
Reckless Surrender, (1997)
Gentle Yearning, (1998)
Summer Magic, (1999)
A Younger Man, (2002)
Secrets Never Told, (2003)
Lessons of a Lowcountry Summer, (2004)
All My Tomorrows, (2005)
A Time to Keep, (2006)
Pleasure Seekers, (2007)
After Hours, (2008)
Naughty, (2009)
Butterfly, (2010)

The Hideaway Series 
The Hideaway Series has started to be reissued on the Harlequin brand.

Prequels
Best-Kept Secrets (2010) Reissue 2010

First Generation
Hideaway (1995) Reissue 2009
Hidden Agenda (1997) Reissue 2009
Vows (1997) Reissue 2010
Heaven Sent (1998) Reissue 2010

Daughters and Sisters Trilogy
Harvest Moon (1999) Reissue 2011
Just Before Dawn (2000)
Private Passions (2001)
Stranger in My Arms (2007)
Breakaway(2010)

Sons and Brothers Trilogy
No Compromise (2002) Reissue 2009
Homecoming (2002)
Renegade (2003)
Secret Agenda (2009)

The Whitfields of New York
Long Time Coming (2008)
The Sweetest Temptation(2008)
Taken By Storm(2008)

The Best Men Trilogy
Man of Fate (2009)
Man of Fortune (2009)
Man of Fantasy (2009)

The Blackstones of Virginia 
The Long Hot Summer (2004)
Very Private Duty (2004)
Beyond Business (2005)

The Eatons 
Bittersweet Love, (2009)
Sweet Deception, (2009)
Sweet Dreams, (2010)
Twice The Temptation, (2010)
Sweet Persuasions, (2011)
Sweet Destiny, (2011)

Wainwright Legacy 
Because of You, (2010)
Here I Am, (2011)

Collections 
More Than Just Words, Vol. 6, (2010)

Anthologies in collaboration
"Fresh Fruits" in Holiday Cheer (with Angela Benson and Shirley Hailstock)	1995/12
"Hearts of gold" in Love Letters	 (with Donna Hill and Janice Sims) 1997/02
Novella in Rosie's Curl and Weave	(with Donna Hill, Felicia Mason and Francis Ray)	1999/02
Novella in Island Magic	(with Shirley Hailstock, Marcia King-Gamble and Felicia Mason) 2000/02
"Sweet Surrender" in Della's House of Style (with Donna Hill, Felicia Mason and Francis Ray)	2000/07
Novella in Welcome to Leo's (with Donna Hill, Brenda Jackson and Francis Ray)	2000/12
"Stand-in bride" in Going to the Chapel	(with Gwynne Forster, Donna Hill and Francis Ray) 2001/06
"First Fruits" in 'Tis the Season	 (with Donna Hill and Candice Poarch) 2001/10
"From the Heart" in Island Bliss	(with Carmen Green, Marcia King-Gamble and Felicia Mason) 2002/02
"Anniversary" in Twilight Moods	2002/09
"Reunion" in Living Large	(with Donna Hill, Brenda Jackson and Francis Ray) 2003/01
"Summer Madness" in Four Degrees of Heat	(with ReShonda Tate Billingsley, Brenda L. Thomas and Crystal Lacey Winslow) 2004/07
"Love Lessons" in Let's Get it On	(with Donna Hill, Brenda Jackson and Francis Ray) 2004/11
Lost in Sensation & Very Private Duty (with Maureen Child) 2005/01
The Long Hot Summer with Private Indiscretions by Susan Crosby 2005/02
Very Private Duty with Beyond Control by Bronwyn Jameson) 2005/07
Rules of Attraction & Beyond Business (with Susan Crosby) 2005/07
"A Younger Man" in When You Least Expect It (with Brenda Jackson) 2005/09
"Shepherd Moon" in A Season of Miracles (with Adrianne Byrd, Kayla Perrin and Janice Sims) 2005/10
Beyond Business with Apache Nights by Sheri Whitefeather 2006/09

Nonfiction
Getting Political: Stories of a Woman Mayor (2002) (with Alice Crozier and Joan Darrah)

As Susan James

Single novels
Reckless Surrender	1997/04

References

External links

Rochelle Alers Official Website

African-American novelists
American romantic fiction writers
Writers from Manhattan
Living people
1943 births
American women novelists
20th-century American novelists
21st-century American novelists
Women romantic fiction writers
20th-century American women writers
21st-century American women writers
Novelists from New York (state)
20th-century African-American women writers
20th-century African-American writers
21st-century African-American women writers
21st-century African-American writers